Global Village in Dubai is located on Sheikh Mohammed Bin Zayed Road E 311 road (United Arab Emirates) Dubai. It combines cultures of 90 countries across the world at one place.

Many notable international artists such as Jason Derulo, Liam Payne, Now United, Shahrukh Khan, Rahat Fateh Ali Khan, Samira Said, Elissa, Neha Kakkar, Guru Randhawa, Atif Aslam etc. have performed here.

History
Global Village started out in the form of a number of kiosks in January 1997 located on the Creek Side opposite to Dubai Municipality. It then later shifted to the Oud Metha Area near Wafi City for 5 years. Today, Global Village has 6 million visitors at its current location on exit of Sheikh Zayed Exit 37 in Wadi Al Safa.

Sections 
There are four main sections in the Village. These sections consist of events and concerts, carnivals, food, and shopping. The food aisle will have food from all over the world. Concerts, carnivals, and shopping are the same.

Parking 
Dubai Global Village has one of the largest capacity parking in Dubai with a total capacity of 18300 vehicles. The parking is divided into two main categories. One is general parking which is free of cost while the other is paid parking known as VIP Parking. There is valet parking available as well. The parking has a free train and shuttle bus to and from the park.

Facts and figures

2018 Session 
The 23rd session of Dubai Global village started on 30 October 2018. This season will remain open till 13 April 2019. Over 90 countries and 27 pavilion are established in this season. Overall, 23 concerts will be held during this season.

2019 Session 
The 24th session started on 29 October 2019  and was scheduled to close its gates for visitors on 4 April 2020 for the session, but due to the outbreak of the COVID-19 pandemic and as instructed from Dubai Culture and Arts Authority, the session was suspended, in line with ongoing efforts to safeguard public health due to pandemic. Owing to the early closure of the park all the scheduled concerts were canceled too.

2020 Session (Silver Jubilee Season) 
This will be the 25th anniversary, or silver jubilee, of the park, and in keeping with the theme, the new season of Global Village will launch on 25 October and run for 25 weeks, concluding on 18 April 2021. Another change for this season is that the opening hours on Saturday have been extended. The park will be open from 2 pm until 11 pm (it was previously open from 4 pm until midnight).

Incidents
A fire broke out in the China pavilion on 25 June 2018 during a demolition process. No injuries were reported as it was during the off-season.

See also
Developments in Dubai
Arab Media Group
Dubai Shopping Festival

References

External links 
 Official Website of Global Village Dubai
 Complete Guide To Global Village Dubai 

Dubailand